Trini Triggs (born August 8, 1965 in Natchitoches, Louisiana) is an American country music artist. In 1998, he released a self-titled album for MCG/Curb Records; produced by Chuck Howard and Anthony Smith, the album produced three singles on the Billboard Hot Country Singles & Tracks (now Hot Country Songs) charts that year. Triggs also charted a fourth single in 2004 on Asylum-Curb.

Discography

Albums

Singles

Music videos

References

External links
Official web site

Living people
1965 births
American country singer-songwriters
Curb Records artists
People from Natchitoches, Louisiana
Singer-songwriters from Louisiana
African-American country musicians
Country musicians from Louisiana
African-American male songwriters
21st-century African-American male singers
20th-century African-American male singers